Arendalsk, Arendal dialect or Arendal Norwegian (Bokmål and Nynorsk: , ;) is a dialect of Norwegian used in Arendal.

Phonology

 Intervocalic  are realized as voiced . This feature appeared in this dialect in the 20th century.
  is frequently dropped, so that e.g. Lars becomes Læs.
 The ending  is pronounced  (as in Danish), so that the word for 'basement' is kjeller in Bokmål, but kjellå in the Arendal dialect.

This process may be extended to mid vowels.

Tonemes

Phonetic realization
Tonemes of the Arendal dialect are the same as those of the Oslo dialect; accent 1 is low-rising, whereas accent 2 is falling-rising.

Notable speakers
 Gjert Kristoffersen
 Rockebandet Ændal, a heavy metal band that sings in the Arendal dialect

References

Bibliography

 

Culture in Agder
Norwegian dialects
City colloquials
Arendal